Aaron Fish (born 1962) is a Canadian entrepreneur who lives in Vancouver, BC, Canada. He is the Founder/CEO of Accordios Worldwide Enterprises Inc.

External links
Official Accordios Worldwide Enterprises Inc. website

1962 births
Living people
Canadian businesspeople